COWEX A/S is a Danish Industrial IT and Automation company which is specialised in solutions of 
	process-technical tasks, in particular computer-based control, regulation and supervision within areas of aquaculture, water supply and industrial automation.

Cowex A/S develops solutions within the industries water supply & waste water, process industry and aquaculture (industrialised fish farming). Within water supply and waste water cowex a/s provides solutions for large municipals as well as smaller private plants. Within the process industry company serves some of Denmark's largest businesses at the same time as it creates specialised solutions adapted smaller companies. Within aquaculture cowex a/s makes solutions mainly to industrialised plants with built-in water treatment and recirculation.

History 
The company was founded in June 1992 under the name Pedersen Proces Aps by its present owner and managing director, Henrik Dam Pedersen.

Concurrently with the general development, the founding of the Saint Petersburg department in Russia year 2000 and the development in the number of international customers and business partners, the company in 2002 changed its status to a limited company and at the same time its name to Cowex A/S.

External links
Industrial IT, Automation, Process Technology @ cowex a/s (English)
Industrial IT, Automation, Process Technology @ cowex a/s (Danish)

Software companies of Denmark
Companies based in Gentofte Municipality